Farquhar Airport  is an airport serving Farquhar Atoll, part of the Farquhar Group of islands in the Outer Islands of the Seychelles.

The atoll comprises several islands; the airstrip is on Île du Nord (North Island). The runway length includes a  displaced threshold on Runway 31.

See also

Transport in Seychelles
List of airports in Seychelles

References

External links
OpenStreetMap - Farquhar
OurAirports - Farquhar
FallingRain - Farquhar Airport

Airports in Seychelles